Theory of Games and Economic Behavior, published in 1944 by Princeton University Press, is a book by mathematician John von Neumann and economist Oskar Morgenstern which is considered the groundbreaking text that created the interdisciplinary research field of game theory. In the introduction of its 60th anniversary commemorative edition from the Princeton University Press, the book is described as "the classic work upon which modern-day game theory is based."

Overview
The book is based partly on earlier research by von Neumann, published in 1928 under the German title "Zur Theorie der Gesellschaftsspiele" ("On the Theory of Board Games").

The derivation of expected utility from its axioms appeared in an appendix to the Second Edition (1947). Von Neumann and Morgenstern used objective probabilities, supposing that all the agents had the same probability distribution, as a convenience. However, Neumann and Morgenstern mentioned that a theory of subjective probability could be provided, and this task was completed by Jimmie Savage in 1954  and Johann Pfanzagl in 1967.  Savage extended von Neumann and Morgenstern's axioms of rational preferences to endogenize probability and make it subjective.  He then used Bayes' theorem to update these subject probabilities in light of new information, thus linking rational choice and inference.

See also

 
 Commemorative edition of the book Theory of Games and Economic Behavior

References

External links
 Theory of Games and Economic Behavior, full text at archive.org (public domain)

1944 non-fiction books
Economics books
Books about game theory
Political science books
Sociology books
1944 in economics
John von Neumann
Princeton University Press books
Collaborative non-fiction books